Krisztián Lovassy (born 23 June 1988) is a Hungarian road bicycle racer, who currently rides for Hungarian amateur team Epronex–Hungary Cycling Team.

Career 
Born in Budapest, Lovassy competed at the 2012 Summer Olympics in the Men's road race, but failed to finish. At the 2017 UEC European Track Championships held in Berlin he earned a silver medal in the men's scratch race.

Major results

Road

2009
 3rd Banja Luka–Belgrade I
 5th Overall Grand Prix Cycliste de Gemenc
1st Stage 1
2010
 2nd Time trial, National Road Championships
 8th Central European Tour Gyomaendröd GP
2011
 1st Banja Luka–Belgrade I
 2nd Road race, National Road Championships
 3rd GP  2000
 4th Central European Tour Budapest GP
 7th Overall Tour of Romania
1st Stage 6
 7th Tour of Vojvodina II
2012
 1st Central European Tour Miskolc GP
 2nd Central European Tour Budapest GP
 3rd Road race, National Road Championships
 3rd Grand Prix Dobrich II
 8th Gran Premio della Costa Etruschi
 10th Grand Prix Dobrich I
 10th Banja Luka–Belgrade I
2013
 1st  Road race, National Road Championships
 1st Central European Tour Budapest GP
 5th Trofej Umag
 5th Central European Tour Košice–Miskolc
2014
 National Road Championships
2nd Time trial
3rd Road race
 7th Central European Tour Košice–Miskolc
2015
 1st  Time trial, National Road Championships
 7th Duo Normand (with Gediminas Kaupas)
 8th Overall Tour de Hongrie
 10th Visegrad 4 Bicycle Race – GP Slovakia
2016
 2nd Road race, National Road Championships
2017
 1st  Road race, National Road Championships
 10th Duo Normand (with Jan Petelin)
2019
 1st Stage 3a Tour de Hongrie

Track

2017
 1st  Kilo, National Championships
 2nd  Scratch, UEC European Championships
2018
 National Championships
1st  Omnium
1st  Scratch
1st  Points race
2019
 National Championships
1st  Omnium
1st  Scratch
2020
 National Championships
1st  Omnium
1st  Scratch
1st  Individual pursuit
1st  Points race
1st  Team sprint

References

External links

Hungarian male cyclists
1988 births
Living people
Olympic cyclists of Hungary
Cyclists at the 2012 Summer Olympics
European Games competitors for Hungary
Cyclists at the 2015 European Games
Cyclists at the 2019 European Games
Cyclists from Budapest